Crenicichla hemera is a species of cichlid native to South America. It is found in the Amazon River basin, in the upper Aripuanã River and in the Madeira River drainage.

References

hemera
Fish of the Amazon basin
Taxa named by Sven O. Kullander
Fish described in 1990